Leo A. Marcum (born August 10, 1942) was an American politician in the state of Kentucky. He served in the Kentucky House of Representatives as a Republican from 1978 to 1979. Marcum was a lawyer, serving as a Commonwealth Attorney from the 24th Judicial district from 1987 to 2002. He was disbarred in 2012 after being found guilty on charges of tax evasion.

References

1942 births
Living people
Republican Party members of the Kentucky House of Representatives